Romeny-sur-Marne (literally Romeny on Marne) is a commune in the Aisne department in Hauts-de-France in northern France.

Population

Personalities
Jules Ernest Renoux
Edith Piaf
Marcel Cerdan

Geography
The village is located along the Marne (right bank), 4.5 km east of Charly-sur-Marne, 2 km north of Nogent-l'Artaud and 12 km southwest of Château-Thierry.

See also
Communes of the Aisne department

References

Communes of Aisne
Aisne communes articles needing translation from French Wikipedia